Red Rock Canyon Open Space is a  city park in Colorado Springs, Colorado.  It is situated on the west side of the city, adjacent to Manitou Springs and south of U.S. Route 24.  The park consists of a series of parallel ridges (called "hogbacks") and eroded canyons. While these ridges, relatively low compared to other in the region, include a continuation of the same sandstone rocks of the Fountain and Lyons formations that make up the Garden of the Gods a few miles to the north, most of the other rock formations also associated with the geology of the Colorado Front Range can be accessed within a short walking distance.

Rather than being pristine conservation land, the park contains a number of reclaimed former industrial sites, including quarries, gravel pits, a gold refining mill, and a   landfill.  The land parcels were purchased piecemeal by John George Bock in the 1920s and 1930s, and acquired by the city of Colorado Springs in 2003 for use as a recreational site.  Today the most visible scars from past exploitation of the land are the remains of the Kenmuir Quarry, which produced Lyons sandstone in the late 19th and early 20th centuries, and the Gypsum canyon landfill, which operated from 1970 to 1986 and remains off-limits to park visitors.

The park contains many miles of trails of varying difficulty that wind through and around the rock formations, and is popular with hikers, joggers, and mountain bikers.  The park trails connect to the Intemann trail to Manitou Springs and the Section 16 conservation area to the south.  Technical rock climbing is allowed with a permit.

In 2012, it was awarded the Stewardship Award by the Trails and Open Space Coalition

References

 City of Colorado Springs - Red Rock Canyon
 Friends of Red Rock Canyon

Parks in Colorado Springs, Colorado